The Six Flags Over Texas Oil Derrick is a  tall observation tower, and an attraction at the theme park Six Flags Over Texas. Six Flags claims it to be the world's tallest land-based oil derrick (although it is actually not functional as such, and never has been). When the tower opened, it had a twelve-lane slide, attached at the first balcony level (50 ft), on which riders could slide down on using burlap bags. With two elevators holding 50 people each, the attraction has a capacity of 2000 riders per hour. The tower served as a replacement for the former Sky Hook.

References 

Towers completed in 1969
Amusement rides manufactured by Intamin
Six Flags attractions
Six Flags Over Texas
Amusement rides introduced in 1969
Observation towers in the United States